This is the all-time Philippine Basketball Association team standings, which includes all of the teams that participated. Standings are accurate as of the elimination round of 2023 PBA Governors' Cup. Guest teams are listed below, may have participated at least one conference, but all teams here have played at least one conference in the PBA.

Key:
 Active team
 Disbanded team
 Guest team, currently not in league.

References
 2015 edition of Hardcourt, the official PBA annual

Philippine Basketball Association lists